Lansing Stone School is a historic building located in Lansing, Iowa, United States.  The two story structure was constructed in 1864 using locally quarried limestone.  The cupola on the center front of the building is original.  The building was enlarged in 1867 when the wings on the north and south sides were added.  It served as a school building for 108 years.  It was listed on the National Register of Historic Places in 1973.

References 

School buildings completed in 1864
Buildings and structures in Allamakee County, Iowa
National Register of Historic Places in Allamakee County, Iowa
School buildings on the National Register of Historic Places in Iowa
Lansing, Iowa
Greek Revival architecture in Iowa